Nanojapyx is a genus of diplurans in the family Japygidae.

Species
 Nanojapyx coalingae Smith, 1959
 Nanojapyx gentilei Smith, 1959
 Nanojapyx hamoni Smith, 1959
 Nanojapyx pagesi Smith, 1959
 Nanojapyx pricei Smith, 1959

References

Diplura